Doun Kaev district is a former district of Takéo province comprising the former capital Doun Kaev.

The district was renamed to Krong Doun Kaev (Doun Kaev municipality) in accordance with Sub-Decree No. 226អនក្រ.បក dated December 30, 2008.

Administrative divisions 
The district had 3 communes.

References

Former subdivisions of Cambodia
Geography of Takéo province